The 1994–95 Polska Liga Hokejowa season was the 60th season of the Polska Liga Hokejowa, the top level of ice hockey in Poland. 12 teams participated in the league, and Podhale Nowy Targ won the championship.

Final round

Playoffs

9th-11th place

Relegation 
 KS Cracovia - Znicz Pruszków 4:3/9:4

External links
 Season on hockeyarchives.info

Pol
Polska
Polska Hokej Liga seasons